Esao Andrews is an American painter, working with oil on wood panels. His work blends Gothic grotesque, erotic and surrealism.

Life
Andrews was born and grew up in Mesa, Arizona where he attended Red Mountain High School. He designed skateboards for Baker Skateboards.

Work
Andrews has exhibited in group shows; one with John John Jesse, and another with Travis Louie and Tara McPherson. He has produced cover art for all of Circa Survive's official releases.
.

Andrews recently had a story published in the original Fables graphic novel 1001 Nights of Snowfall. He cites Gustav Klimt, Egon Schiele, Alfons Mucha, and Joe Sorren as influences.

Andrews has said, when asked about possible work as an illustrator; 

Andrews participated in the 2002 BP Portrait Award at the National Portrait Gallery in London.

On the subject of the diversity of his work, Andrews states that he is constantly looking for new subject matter as he does not want to become known for one subject. Andrews also stated when asked about 'good vs evil' in his work that he thinks more along the lines of dominant versus subordinate; that he is attempting to catch a moment of mystery or deviousness in his work.

References

External links 
 Esao.net - Esao Andrew's Official Website
 Video Profile - Friends We Love pay a visit to Esao Andrews' home studio
Esao Andrews' paintings at Beinart Gallery
 Hi Fructose - Hi Fructose, Volume VIII, 2008
 Juxtapoz October 22, 2008 - Juxtapoz.com

Living people
1978 births
People from Mesa, Arizona
Painters from Arizona